Robbie Gall (17 July 1906 – 19 December 1971) was an Australian rules footballer who played with Fitzroy in the Victorian Football League (VFL).

Notes

External links 
		

1906 births
1971 deaths
Australian rules footballers from Victoria (Australia)
Fitzroy Football Club players
Northcote Football Club players